Nicolas Aissat (born 24 July 1980 in Toulouse) is a retired French middle-distance runner who specialised in the 800 metres. He represented his country at the 2004 Summer Olympics reaching the semifinals.

Competition record

Personal bests
Outdoor
800 metres – 1:44.98 (Rovereto 2001)
1000 metres – 2:16.86 (Strasbourg 2001)
1500 metres – 3:41.15 (Pézenas 2005)
Indoor
800 metres – 1:47.06 (Stuttgart 2002)
1000 metres – 2:18.33 (Liévin 2003)
1500 metres – 3:44.12 (Liévin 2001)

References

1980 births
Living people
French male middle-distance runners
Athletes (track and field) at the 2004 Summer Olympics
Olympic athletes of France
Sportspeople from Toulouse